Coleman High School is a public high school located in Coleman, Texas (USA) and classified as a 3A school by the UIL. It is part of the Coleman Independent School District located in central Coleman County. In 2015, the school was rated "Met Standard" by the Texas Education Agency.

In May, 2012, the former Novice School closed due to financial troubles and formally consolidated with Coleman ISD on March 1, 2013.

Athletics
The Coleman Bluecats compete in the following sports:

Baseball
Basketball
Cross Country
Football
Golf
Powerlifting
Softball
Tennis
Track and Field

State titles
Boys Track
2015(3A)

References

External links
Coleman High School

Schools in Coleman County, Texas
Public high schools in Texas